USS Arapaho or USS Arapahoe may refer to:

, a sloop-of-war or frigate which was never constructed, being canceled in 1866
, a tugboat launched on 20 June 1914
, a tugboat laid down on 8 November 1941 at Charleston, South Carolina

United States Navy ship names